Laxson Creek is a stream in Bandera County, Texas, in the United States.

Laxson Creek was named in the 1850s for a pioneer settler.

See also
List of rivers of Texas

References

Rivers of Bandera County, Texas
Rivers of Texas